PetroApocalypse Now? is a 2008 documentary television film about the future of global oil production and peak oil.

Overview
PetroApocalypse Now? examines the arguments surrounding peak oil from both sides of the debate. It dissects the points of view of the oil industry and governments, who believe peak oil is a long way off, and meets the experts from the Association for the Study of Peak Oil and Gas who believe global oil production will begin to decline very soon. Notably, it exposes the evidence surrounding the exaggeration of the oil reserves in Kuwait by travelling there to meet former MP Abdullah Al-Nibari.

Broadcasters
The film was broadcast by CBC Newsworld in Canada as Oil: Apocalypse Now?. It has also been broadcast by Ushuaia TV in France, Metro TV in Indonesia, SVT in Sweden, PBS in the US.

References

External links 
 Official site of the documentary
 CBC Website
 SVT Website(in Swedish)
 

2008 television films
2008 films
Anti-modernist films
Documentary films about peak oil
2008 documentary films